Sophie of Brandenburg-Ansbach-Kulmbach (10 March 1485, Ansbach – 24 May 1537, Liegnitz (Legnica)) was a princess of Brandenburg-Ansbach and was by marriage Duchess of Legnica.

Life 
Sophie was a daughter of the Margrave Frederick the Elder of Brandenburg-Ansbach and Bayreuth (1460–1536) from his marriage to Sophia of Poland ( 1464–1512), daughter of King Casimir IV of Poland.

She married on 24 November 1518 the Duke Frederick II of Legnica in Silesia (1480–1547).  He had built Piast Castle in Legnica in the early 16th Century, the Renaissance main entrance portal is decorated with busts of Sophie and Frederick,  The pair is also shown in a window of the Church of Our Lady of Legnica.

Sophie is not to be confused with her eponymous niece (1535–1587), who was also Duchess of Legnica.

Offspring 
From her marriage, Sophie had the following children:
 Frederick III (1520–1570), Duke of Legnica.
 married in 1538 princess Catherine of Mecklenburg (1518-1581)
 George II (1523–1586), Duke of Brzeg
 married in 1545 princess Barbara of Brandenburg (1527-1595)
 Sophie (1525–1546)
 married in 1545 Elector John George of Brandenburg (1525-1598)

Literature 
 A. velvet: Chronicle of Legnica, printed by W. Pentecost, 1868, p. 204 ff.

References 

House of Hohenzollern
1485 births
1537 deaths
Duchesses of Legnica
Daughters of monarchs